Eat St. is a Canadian reality television series produced by Paperny Entertainment that airs on Food Network Canada and Cooking Channel. It is hosted by Canadian comedian James Cunningham tours North American food trucks. To accompany the series, an Eat St. app was developed that uses GPS to track street fare near the user. The series, which premiered April 6, 2011, has filmed in Vancouver, Calgary, Toronto, and a number of cities in the United States.

Mobile app
An Eat St. app for iPhone was released in 2011, which allows users to discover food trucks in their area and share tips and photos with others. It also includes video clips and recipes from vendors that have appeared on the show.

Broadcast
In the United States, the series airs on Cooking Channel. An episode which aired on January 27, 2015 rated 78,000 viewers. An episode on February 3, 2015 was watched by 62,000 viewers.

References

External links
 
 

Food Network (Canadian TV channel) original programming
2011 Canadian television series debuts
2015 Canadian television series endings
2010s Canadian reality television series
Food travelogue television series
Television series by Corus Entertainment
Television series by Entertainment One